The Flat River is a river in southern Person County, North Carolina and a portion of Durham County, North Carolina.

The river flows from Person County to combine with the Eno river to flow into the Neuse River. The river is the namesake for the township called Flat River, which has the highest census total of the 9 communities in Person County because it is mostly a combination of Hurdle Mills and Timberlake through which the river passes.  North Carolina State University maintains a research forest within its watershed.  Lake Michie, the principal reservoir for the city of Durham, is located on the lower reaches of the Flat River.

References

Rivers of Person County, North Carolina
Rivers of Durham County, North Carolina
Rivers of North Carolina
Tributaries of Pamlico Sound